Cottonport is a town in Avoyelles Parish, Louisiana, United States. The population was 2,006 at the 2010 census.

History
Cottonport was founded in the early 19th century. In 1835, Joseph Jean Pierre Ducote II donated land to be used for a road and school, which was the beginnings of the community. Incorporated in 1888 along the banks of Bayou Rouge (French for "Red Bayou"). In the 19th century, large boats made their way through Cottonport with goods destined for the port of New Orleans. The bayou was deep enough to support the large boats and formed a perfect horseshoe, which allowed vessels to turn around. The boats would deliver cargo into the area and would load crops on board to take to larger ports along the route. The main crop available for exporting at that time was cotton. In fact, because so much cotton was being shipped from the port, early settlers named the village Cottonport.

Present day
Today, over 100 years after its incorporation, Cottonport retains many of its picturesque qualities. Although Bayou Rouge is no longer navigable, it continues to be used as a fishing hole. It also serves as the backdrop to the annual Cottonport Christmas Festival, held the second weekend in December, which celebrated its 50th anniversary in 2015.

Geography
Cottonport is located at  (30.988465, -92.053049).

Demographics

2020 census

As of the 2020 United States census, there were 2,023 people, 711 households, and 435 families residing in the town.

2000 census
As of the census of 2000, there were 2,316 people, 770 households, and 549 families residing in the town. The racial makeup of the town was 48.32% White, 49.65% African American, 0.73% Native American, 0.17% Asian, 0.30% from other races, and 0.82% from two or more races. Hispanic or Latino of any race were 1.04% of the population.

There were 770 households, out of which 40.9% had children under the age of 18 living with them, 38.8% were married couples living together, 27.4% had a female householder with no husband present, and 28.7% were non-families. 26.9% of all households were made up of individuals, and 13.0% had someone living alone who was 65 years of age or older. The average household size was 2.73 and the average family size was 3.26.

In the town, the population was spread out, with 32.3% under the age of 18, 9.5% from 18 to 24, 29.5% from 25 to 44, 18.7% from 45 to 64, and 9.9% who were 65 years of age or older. The median age was 31 years. For every 100 females, there were 71.9 males. For every 100 females age 18 and over, there were 64.8 males.

The median income for a household in the town was $418,973, and the median income for a family was $21,888. Males had a median income of $21,597 versus $18,542 for females. The per capita income for the town was $9,507. About 34.5% of families and 40.2% of the population were below the poverty line, including 54.7% of those under age 18 and 27.3% of those age 65 or over.

Notable people

Bill Callegari, Republican member of the Texas House of Representatives from northwestern Harris County since 2001; an engineer and businessman in Katy, Texas; born in Cottonport in 1941
Moon Ducote, football, baseball, and basketball player and coach, born in Cottonport.
Connie Francois Desselle, Avoyelles Parish Clerk of Court, 2019-Present.

References

Towns in Avoyelles Parish, Louisiana
Towns in Louisiana